Elizabeth Youatt or Mrs. W.H. Coates (1816 – 1879) was a British novelist.

Life
Youatt was one of four daughters born to the vet William Youatt. She wrote a large number of short novels for the Religious Tract Society. Her two most notable works were three volume novels published in the 1840s. Her father was the Queen's vet and he was a suicide in 1847 at the age of 71.

In 1851 she married the younger William Henry Coates who was secretary to the Royal College of Veterinary Surgeons. When her friend the more successful novelist Ellen Pickering died prematurely in 1851 she completed her novel, The Grandfather. Youatt died in 1879.

References

1816 births
1879 deaths
British women novelists
19th-century British novelists
Writers from London
Victorian women writers
Victorian writers